Steve, Stephen, or Steven Peterson  may refer to:
 Steve Peterson (actor), American actor
 Steve Peterson (racing executive) (1950–2008), American technical director for NASCAR
 Steve Peterson, American musician in Peninsula Banjo Band
 Stephen Peterson (rower), American rower
 Steve Peterson (game designer), founder of Hero Games

See also
Steve Pederson (disambiguation)